Home, James is a 1928 American silent comedy film directed by William Beaudine. This is a preserved film at the UCLA Film and Television Archive and Cinematheque Royale de Belgique, Brussels.

Cast
 Laura La Plante as Laura Elliot
 Charles Delaney as James Lacey Jr
 Aileen Manning as Mrs. Elliot
 Joan Standing as Iris Elliot
 George C. Pearce as James Lacey Sr
 Arthur Hoyt as William Waller (floorwalker)
 Sidney Bracey as Haskins (the butler)

References

External links

1928 films
1928 comedy films
Silent American comedy films
American silent feature films
American black-and-white films
Films directed by William Beaudine
Films with screenplays by Joseph F. Poland
Universal Pictures films
1920s American films